Zoël Amberg (born 25 September 1992 in Stans) is a professional racing driver from Switzerland.

Career

Karting

Amberg began karting in 2004 and raced primarily in his native Switzerland for the majority of his career, working his way up from the junior ranks to progress through to the KF3 and KF2 categories by 2008, when he became a works driver for the Birel Motorsport team.

Formula Renault 2.0
In 2009, Amberg graduated to single–seaters, racing in both the Italian Formula Renault 2.0 and Swiss Formula Renault 2.0 championships for Jenzer Motorsport. Two race victories at the final round of the season in Imola saw him finish fourth in the Italian series, whilst in the Swiss Formula Renault 2.0 championship he finished fifth overall after scoring points in all but one of the 12 races. During the year he also contested a single round of the Formula Renault 2.0 West European Cup at Barcelona.

Amberg remained in Swiss Formula Renault 2.0 for a second season in 2010, when the series became known as the Formula Renault 2.0 Middle European Championship. He won the title in dominant fashion, finishing on the podium in all ten races he competed in, winning six of them.

Formula Abarth
Also in 2010, Amberg contested a full season in the newly launched Formula Abarth series in Italy. He took a single victory at the opening round of the season in Misano and a further eight points–scoring positions to finish seventh in the championship.

GP3 Series
In October 2010, Amberg made his debut in a GP3 Series car, taking part in the two post–season tests at Estoril and Jerez with Jenzer Motorsport, and in March 2011 it was announced that he had signed to race for ATECH CRS GP in the 2011 season, joining British Formula Renault 2.0 graduates Marlon Stöckinger and Nick Yelloly. He failed to score a point in the sixteen races he entered, taking a best race result of tenth at the sprint race in Barcelona.

Formula Three
In October 2011, Amberg joined De Villota Motorsport to contest the final three rounds of the European F3 Open season. Despite only taking part in six races, he finished eighth in the championship, taking four podium positions including a win at the final round in Barcelona.

Formula Renault 3.5 Series
In October 2010, Amberg  made his debut at the wheel of a Formula Renault 3.5 Series car, testing for new team BVM–Target at Motorland Aragón. After testing extensively for Pons Racing during the latter part of 2011, it was confirmed in December 2011 that Amberg had signed a two–year contract with the team, beginning with the 2012 season. He will be joined by Formula Three graduate Yann Cunha.

Racing record

Career summary

Complete GP3 Series results
(key) (Races in bold indicate pole position) (Races in italics indicate fastest lap)

Complete Formula Renault 3.5 Series results
(key) (Races in bold indicate pole position) (Races in italics indicate fastest lap)

 Did not finish, but was classified as he had completed more than 90% of the race distance.

Complete GP2 Series results
(key) (Races in bold indicate pole position) (Races in italics indicate fastest lap)

Complete FIA World Endurance Championship results

24 Hours of Le Mans results

References

External links

1992 births
Living people
People from Stans
Sportspeople from Nidwalden
Swiss racing drivers
Formula Abarth drivers
Formula Renault 2.0 Alps drivers
Italian Formula Renault 2.0 drivers
Formula Renault 2.0 WEC drivers
Swiss GP3 Series drivers
24 Hours of Le Mans drivers
Euroformula Open Championship drivers
World Series Formula V8 3.5 drivers
Blancpain Endurance Series drivers
GP2 Series drivers
FIA World Endurance Championship drivers
Jenzer Motorsport drivers
CRS Racing drivers
Pons Racing drivers
AV Formula drivers
Team Lazarus drivers
Morand Racing drivers
De Villota Motorsport drivers
Boutsen Ginion Racing drivers